The Siberian elm cultivar Ulmus pumila 'Chinkota'  is from a seed-produced line of extremely cold-hardy and drought-resistant trees raised in the United States. The tree was developed from seed of the cultivar 'Dropmore' by the Horticulture & Forestry Department of South Dakota State University after World War II

Description
'Chinkota' is distinguished from 'Dropmore' by its lower branching habit and earlier dormancy .

Pests and diseases
See under Ulmus pumila. Lime-induced chlorosis is not a problem with this cultivar.

Cultivation
'Chinkota' was extensively trialled during the 1950s in the northern central states of the US by the USDA's Agricultural Research Service. The tree performed very well, and was recommended not only for windbreak and shelterbelt use, but also as an urban ornamental on the high plains area of Kansas and Nebraska.
The cultivar is not known to be in cultivation beyond North America.

References

Siberian elm cultivar
Ulmus articles missing images